North Carolina Highway 47 (NC 47) is a primary state highway in the U.S. state of North Carolina. It travels east–west through Davidson and Randolph counties; connecting the town of Denton with nearby Lexington and Asheboro.

Route description
Its western terminus is at the Interstate 285, Interstate 85 Business (I-85 Bus.), U.S. Route 29 (US 29), US 52, and US 70 interchange (exit 84) in Lexington. Heading in a southern direction, it connects with I-85, where NC 47 provides a connector between southbound I-85 with northbound I-85 Bus and vice versa. Continuing south, it travels through the community of Linwood, where it turns east, crossing NC 8 and Abbots Creek. Continuing in a southeasterly direction, NC 47 makes its way into the heart of Denton. After joining NC 109 for less than a mile, NC 47 exits Denton along Bombay Road to its eastern terminus at NC 49.

History 
NC 47 first appeared in 1935 when NC 40A was re-signed. This early NC 47 ran from US 158 in Roanoke Rapids to US 301 in Pleasant Hill. Sometime between 1951 and 1953, it was subsumed by NC 48.

The current NC 47 was established in 1972 as a new primary routing between NC 8 to NC 109, in Denton; this was an upgrade of a combination of several secondary roads. In 1974, NC 47 was extended east, as a new primary routing, to its current eastern terminus with NC 49. In 1981, NC 47 was extended west on new primary routing, through Linwood, to I-85/US 29/US 52/US 70 (exit 86). In 1993, NC 47 was rerouted north from Linwood to I-85 (exit 88); its former alignment becoming Belmont Road (SR 3159). In 2013, NC 47 was extended north to its current western terminus with I-85 Business/US 29/US 52/US 70 (exit 84). In December 2018, NC 47 was adjusted at its western terminus from the northbound I-285 exit/entrance ramps to a continuation along Hargave Lane (at Aviation Way) to the overpass bridge at I-285.

Major intersections

References

External links

NCRoads.com: N.C. 47

047
Transportation in Davidson County, North Carolina
Transportation in Randolph County, North Carolina